Road 27 is a road in East Azarbaijan, Iran connecting Tabriz to Ahar and northern province to Khomarlu.

References

External links 

 Iran road map on Young Journalists Club

27
Transport in Tabriz
Transportation in East Azerbaijan Province